Ignatz Gresser (August 15, 1835 – August 1, 1919) was an American soldier and member of the 128th Pennsylvania Infantry Regiment who fought in the American Civil War and was awarded the Medal of Honor for carrying a wounded Union soldier from the field of battle at Antietam.

Gresser was born in Germany and emigrated to the United States in 1851 at the age of 15. He was a cobbler before and after the war. The soldier he saved was William Henry Sowden, who would go on to serve in the U.S. House of Representatives.

Ignatz Gresser died in Allentown, Pennsylvania on August 1, 1919 and was buried in West End cemetery in Allentown, where a statue is erected in his honor.

Medal of Honor citation
Rank and organization. Corporal, Company D, 128th Pennsylvania Infantry Regiment. Place and date: At Antietam, Maryland, September 17, 1862. Entered service at: Lehigh County, Pennsylvania. Birth: Germany. Date of issue: December 12, 1895.

Citation
While exposed to the fire of the enemy, carried from the field a wounded comrade.

References

1835 births
1919 deaths
Union Army soldiers
United States Army Medal of Honor recipients
American Civil War recipients of the Medal of Honor
German-born Medal of Honor recipients
German emigrants to the United States